The OMI Charger was a single-hulled oil tanker built in 1969 and used by the OMI Corporation.

Disaster 
On October 9, 1993 while the tanker was anchored at Boliver Roads near Galveston, Texas, work began on sealing a previously discovered leak in a cargo tank. When a crew member lit an arc welder inside a tank, it ignited gasoline vapors, causing a tremendous explosion which killed three crew members and injured seven. The subsequent fire burned for five hours, and the ship was a total loss.

A US Coast Guard investigation determined that the cargo tank had been improperly cleared and insufficiently tested prior to the incident.

References

Maritime incidents in 1993
Shipwrecks of the Texas coast
1969 ships
Oil tankers